"Somebody Else Will" is a song written by Kelly Archer, Adam Hambrick, and Tebey and recorded by American country music artist Justin Moore. It was released in October 2016 as the second single from Moore’s 2016 album Kinda Don't Care.

Commercial performance
"Somebody Else Will" first entered the US Billboard Country Airplay at No. 59 on the chart date of November 12, 2016, but did not debut on Hot Country Songs until it did so on February 4, 2017 at number 47. It reached No. 1 on Country Airplay in its 43rd week on the chart.  The song has sold 212,000 copies in the United States as of September 2017.

Charts

Weekly charts

Year-end charts

References 

2016 songs
2016 singles
Justin Moore songs
Big Machine Records singles
Songs written by Kelly Archer
Songs written by Tebey
Song recordings produced by Jeremy Stover
Songs written by Adam Hambrick